Obrež (in older sources Obrežje) is a settlement on the left bank of the Drava River in the Municipality of Središče ob Dravi in northeastern Slovenia. The area belongs to the traditional region of Styria and is now included in the Drava Statistical Region.

Notable residents
Jakob Aleksič (1897–1980), theologian

References

External links
Obrež on Geopedia

Populated places in the Municipality of Središče ob Dravi